General Pulteney may refer to:

Harry Pulteney (1686–1767), British Army general
James Pulteney (c. 1755–1811), British Army general
William Pulteney (British Army officer) (1861–1941), British Army lieutenant general